__notoc__
The Sisters of St. Joseph of Peace are a Roman Catholic religious order of women which was founded in January 1884 in the Diocese of Nottingham, England by Margaret Anna Cusack.

History
Cusack was raised in the Anglican church, but converted to Catholicism in 1858. She entered the Poor Clare Sisters, and was then known as Sister Francis Clare. She worked in many forms of ministry in Ireland over the years, and was known for her writing. In 1881, she went to Knock, in County Mayo, to open a school for young women during the day, which held evening classes for daytime land workers. Other women were inspired by this work, and this led her to decision to form her own community, the Sisters of Saint Joseph of Peace. Conflict with Church leaders in Knock caused her to seek support in England, and in 1884, with the support of Cardinal Manning and Bishop Bagshawe, she received approval for her new order from Pope Leo XIII, and the Congregation of the Sisters of St. Joseph of Peace was founded.

In 1888 Cusack who had left the convent became a protestant. The survival of the order fell to Bagshawe and Honoria Gaffney and they are described by some as the co-founders. Gaffney had to redo all of the application details, the order was not formally approved until 1924.

The order is governed as a single congregation located in three regions: 

Sacred Heart Province in the United Kingdom includes Sisters and Associates living in England, Ireland, and Scotland.
St. Joseph Province in the Eastern United States includes Sisters and Associates living in Delaware, Florida, Maryland, New Jersey, New York, and Rhode Island.
Our Lady Province in the Western United States includes Sisters and Associates living in Alaska, California, Minnesota, Nevada, North Carolina, Oregon, Washington, British Columbia, El Salvador, and Guatemala.

In 2009, the sisters joined the mission at the Hôpital Sacré Coeur in Milot, Haiti.

Noted sisters 
 Margaret Anna Cusack, also known as Sister Francis 
 Sister Evangelista Gaffney (1853 - ), born Honoria Gaffney

See also 
 
 Saint Joseph

References

External links 
General
 The Congregation of the Sisters of Saint Joseph of Peace
 Steele, F., Sisters of St. Joseph, Little Daughters of St. Joseph, Fox, J., & Bagshawe, E. (1910). Sisters of Saint Joseph. In The Catholic Encyclopedia. New York: Robert Appleton Company. Retrieved from New Advent: Chapter Heading, "Sisters of Saint Joseph of Peace"

Europe
 Sisters of Saint Joseph of Peace, United Kingdom

North America
 Sisters of Saint Joseph of Peace, Western US
 Sisters of Saint Joseph of Peace, Eastern US

Associated blogs
 Musings of a Discerning Woman by Susan Francois, CSJP
 At the Corner of Susan and St. Joseph by Susan Francois, CSJP

Catholic female orders and societies
Christianity in Nottinghamshire
Catholic religious institutes established in the 19th century
Religious organizations established in 1884